Sweet Briar House, also known as Locust Ridge, is a historic home located at Sweet Briar, Amherst County, Virginia.  The original house was built about 1825, and was a Federal style brick farmhouse with a hipped roof.  The house was extensively remodeled in 1851 in the Italian Villa-style. The remodeling added a two-level arcaded portico with a one-story verandah across the facade and two three-story towers of unequal height and form. Also on the property is a late-19th century latticed well house.  The house now serves as the residence for the president of Sweet Briar College.

It was added to the National Register of Historic Places in 1970.

References

Houses in Amherst County, Virginia
Houses completed in 1851
Federal architecture in Virginia
Italianate architecture in Virginia
Houses on the National Register of Historic Places in Virginia
National Register of Historic Places in Amherst County, Virginia
Houses completed in 1825
1851 establishments in Virginia